Jock Scott (6 October 1887 – 14 January 1967) was a Scotland international rugby union player who played at the Flanker position.

Rugby Union career

Amateur career

Scott played for Edinburgh Academicals.

Provincial career

Scott was capped by Glasgow District in 1906. He was later capped by the Cities District side that same season in early 1907. He played for the Blues Trial side against the Whites Trial side on 21 January 1911 while still with Edinburgh Academicals.

International career

Scott was capped by Scotland for 21 matches.

References

1887 births
1967 deaths
Scottish rugby union players
Edinburgh Academicals rugby union players
Scotland international rugby union players
Edinburgh District (rugby union) players
Cities District players
Blues Trial players
Rugby union players from Edinburgh
Rugby union flankers